Lamb's Gambol may refer to:

The frolicking dance of lambs, often referred to as a gambol
Shows put on by the Lambs Club of New York City
The Lamb's Gambol, a 1914 performance with an overture by John Philip Sousa
The Lamb's Gambol, a 1949 American Comedy television show with Jackie Gleason